The Committee for the Implementation of Textile Agreements is the United States federal committee "responsible matters affecting textile trade policy and for supervising the implementation of all textile trade agreements."

History
In 2005 the Committee solicited comments on limiting the import of cotton bras from China.

References

External links

United States federal boards, commissions, and committees
United States trade policy